GraphiCon is the largest International conference on computer graphics and computer vision in the countries of the former Soviet Union.

The conference is hosted by Moscow State University in association with Keldysh Institute of Applied Mathematics, Russian Center of Computing for Physics and Technology, and the Russian Computer Graphics Society. The Conference is held in close cooperation with Eurographics Association.

Conference topics 

The main topics of the conference include (this list is not exhaustive):

 Graphics and multimedia:
 Geometry modeling and processing
 Photorealistic rendering techniques
 Scientific visualization
 Image-based techniques
 Computer graphics for mobile devices
 Computer graphics hardware
 Graphics in computer games
 Animation and simulation
 Virtual and augmented reality
 Image and video processing:
 Medical image processing
 Early vision and image representation
 Tracking and surveillance
 Segmentation and grouping
 Image enhancement, restoration and super-resolution
 Computer vision:
 3D reconstruction and acquisition
 Object localization and recognition
 Multi-sensor fusion and 3D registration
 Structure from motion and stereo
 Scene modeling
 Statistical methods and learning
 Applications

Format 

The following sections are organized for the event:
 Young scientists school courses and master classes
 Full paper presentations
 Work in progress presentations
 STAR reports
 Invited talks
 Industrial presentations
 Multimedia shows
 Round table discussions

Specific GraphiCon conferences

See also 

 Eurographics — the biggest conference on computer graphics in Europe
 SIGGRAPH — the world biggest conference on computer graphics
 List of computer science conferences#Computer_graphics

External links 
 http://www.graphicon.ru/

Computer vision research infrastructure
Computer graphics conferences